Brephidium is a genus of butterflies in the family Lycaenidae. They are known commonly as pygmy blues. The species of this genus have a disjunct distribution. Two of the three species are found in the Americas while the third is found in Africa.

Species
The following three species are in the genus Brephidium:
Brephidium exilis (Boisduval, 1852) – western pygmy blue (southern United States to South America)
Brephidium metophis (Wallengren, 1860) – South Africa, Namibia, Botswana, Mozambique, Zimbabwe
Brephidium pseudofea (Morrison, 1873) – eastern pygmy blue (southeastern United States)

References

Lycaenidae genera